Cheraman Perumal Nayanar (literally meaning Chera king the Nayanar) was a bhakti poet-musician and religious teacher (one of the sixty-three nayanars) of Tamil Shaiva tradition in medieval south India. The Cheraman Perumal's friendship with Chundara, one of the 'Three Nayanars', is celebrated in the bhakti tradition. The legend of the Cheraman Perumal is narrated in the hagiographic 'Periyapuranam', composed by Chekkizhar, a courtier of Chola Kulottunga II, in mid-12th century AD. The collection is based on an earlier work by Nambiyandar Nambi (10th-11th centuries AD). Thiruvanchikulam Siva Temple in Kodungallur is associated with the Perumal and Chundaramurtti Nayanar.  

The Cheraman Perumal is credited as the author of 'Ponvannattandadi', hymns in praise of the Lord of Chidambaram, 'Thiruvarur Mummanikkovai', in honor of the deity of Thiruvarur, and 'Adiyula' (the first of the ulas) or 'Thirukkailayajnana Ula', in praise of Shiva. Historians tentatively identify the saint with Rama Rajasekhara, the 9th century ruler of the Chera Perumal kingdom of Kerala.

The legend of Cheraman Perumal 

The Cheraman Perumal, according to tradition, was born in the ruling family of Malai-nadu (which had its capital at Kodunkolur or Makotai by the ocean). When the then king 'Chenkor-poraiyan' abdicated his throne, the ministers persuaded the young Cheraman or 'Perumakkotaiyar', also known as 'Kalarirrarivar', to take up the reins of the kingdom (the prince was sitting in meditation at the Tiruvanchaikkalam at this time). The prince was only prevailed upon with great difficulty. 

Cheraman Perumal then learned about lyricist Chundara (from the Nataraja of Chidambaram himself), another Shiva devotee, singing at Chidambaram, and wished to meet him and pay homage. Accordingly the king left his capital and after passing through the Kongu country, finally reached Chidambaram. He then proceeded to Tiruvarur, and met with Chundra. The two became close friends over time and started on a long pilgrimage across south India (visiting Kirvelur, Nagaikkaronam, Tirumaraikkadu, Palanam, Agastyanpalli, Kulagar-Kodikkoyil, Tirupattur, Madurai, Tiruppuvanam, Tiruvappanur, Tiruvedagam, Tirupparangunram, Kurralam, Kurumbala, Tirunelveli, Ramesvaram, Tiruchchuliyal, Kanapper, Tiruppunavayil, Patalesvaram, Tirukkandiyur and Tiruvaiyyaru) .

Years later, Chundara visited his fellow-devotee Cheraman Perumal at Kodunkolur and stayed in the city as a royal guest. One day messengers from Shiva arrived at Tiruvanchaikkalam to inform Chundara that it was now time for him to 'return' to Mount Kailasa. Chundara hence ascended to Kailasa on a white elephant (with the Chera king following him on horseback).

References 

Nayanars
Indian Shaivite religious leaders
People of the Kodungallur Chera kingdom
Kodungallur Chera kings